Jim Walter Berry (30 May 1945 – 14 December 2020) was a Canadian international soccer player. He represented Canada at the 1967 Pan American Games and appeared in four full internationals for Canada, all of them qualification matches for the 1970 World Cup. In 1972, he played in the National Soccer League with London German Canadians.

Berry died on 14 December 2020 at a hospice in Missiauga after battling for 5 years with Parkinson's and heart disease, at the age of 75.

References

1945 births
2020 deaths
Canadian soccer players
Canada men's international soccer players
Soccer players from Vancouver
UBC Thunderbirds soccer players
Pan American Games competitors for Canada
Footballers at the 1967 Pan American Games
Association football defenders
Canadian National Soccer League players